Princess Theodora of Greece and Denmark (born 9 June 1983), also known under her stage name Theodora Greece, is a British actress and member of the Greek and Danish royal families.

Biography

Early life 
Theodora was born on 9 June 1983 at St Mary's Hospital, London. She is the younger daughter and fourth of the five children of the deposed Greek King Constantine II (1940–2023) and Princess Anne-Marie of Denmark.

On 20 October 1983, she was christened at the Saint Sophia Cathedral, London. Her godparents are Queen Elizabeth II of the United Kingdom, Queen Margrethe II of Denmark (her maternal aunt), King Michael I of Romania and Alexander, Crown Prince of Yugoslavia.

Education 
Theodora attended the all-girls boarding institution, Woldingham School, situated in Surrey, England, between 1994 and 2001. After a gap year spent at St Philip's College in Alice Springs, Australia, Theodora attended Brown University where she received her Bachelor of Arts on 28 May 2006 in Theatre Arts, having also attended Northeastern University in Boston. Subsequently, she undertook graduate studies at Central Saint Martins College of Art and Design.

Career 
In April 2010, Theodora moved to Los Angeles to pursue an acting career, appearing in supporting roles under the name Theodora Greece. She made her television debut as secretary Alison Montgomery in the long-running soap opera The Bold and the Beautiful, on 5 December 2011.

Personal life 
On 16 November 2018, it was announced that Princess Theodora was engaged to Los Angeles-based attorney Matthew Jeremiah Kumar (born on 15 December 1983 in Ventura County, California). He is the son of Samuel Kumar (né Shalendra Kumar, born on 28 July 1954 in Fiji) and Yolanda "Lonnie" Sherry Richards (born on 10 November 1953). He has an older brother, Reggie Samuel Kumar (born on 17 April 1978 in Los Angeles County, California).Greek Royal Family The wedding was due to take place in Spetses in May 2020, but was postponed due to the coronavirus pandemic. Later sources confirm that the wedding will take place in Porto Heli in early summer of 2023.

Filmography
 The Great Awakening (2022)
 Static [short] (2018)
 Respect Greece (2017) 
 Gates of Hades (2017)
 Blind Follow (2016) The Assistant (2016)June (2015)Little Boy (2015)The Bold and the Beautiful (2011–2018)June (2014)Shang (2013)Nevan Saunders' Quest for Fame: A Documentary by Kip Griffen (2011)Sroloc (2010) The Lightkeepers (2009)De vilde svaner (2009)

Titles and styles 
 9 June 1983 – present: Her Royal Highness'' Princess Theodora of Greece and Denmark.

Honours

   :
Dame 1st Class of the Order of Saints Olga and Sophia

Ancestry

Her paternal grandparents were King Paul of Greece and Frederica of Hanover. Her maternal grandparents are Frederick IX of Denmark and Ingrid of Sweden. As an agnatic descendant of Christian IX of Denmark Theodora is a Danish princess, and because King Christian's second son, Prince William of Denmark, was elected "George I, King of the Hellenes" in 1863, her father (George's great-grandson) inherited the throne of Greece in 1964.

References

External links

1983 births
Living people
20th-century Greek people
20th-century Greek women
21st-century Greek actresses
21st-century British actresses
Danish princesses
Greek princesses
British film actresses
British television actresses
People from Paddington
House of Glücksburg (Greece)
Brown University alumni
People educated at Woldingham School
Greek exiles
Members of the Church of Greece
Daughters of kings
Children of Constantine II of Greece